Lemsterland is a former municipality in the northern Netherlands. In 2014 it merged with the municipalities of Skarsterlân and Gaasterlân-Sleat to form the new municipality De Fryske Marren.

Population centres 
 Bantega
 Delfstrahuizen
 Echten
 Echtenerbrug
 Eesterga
 Follega
 Lemmer
 Oosterzee
 Oosterzee-Buren

References

External links

De Fryske Marren
Former municipalities of Friesland
Municipalities of the Netherlands disestablished in 2014